Chiapilla is a town and one of the 119 Municipalities of Chiapas, in southern Mexico. It covers an area of 86.9 km2.

As of 2010, the municipality had a total population of 5,405, up from 4,957 as of 2005.

As of 2010, the town of Chiapilla had a population of 3,809. Other than the town of Chiapilla, the municipality had 19 localities, none of which had a population over 1,000.

References

Municipalities of Chiapas